Sinomphisa plagialis, the Manchurian catalpa shoot borer, is a moth in the family Crambidae. It is found in Japan, China and Korea.

The wingspan is 23–26 mm.

The larvae feed on Catalpa bungei and Catalpa ovata. They bore into young shoots of their host plant. The species overwinters in the larval stage.

References

Moths described in 1911
Spilomelinae